Herbert George Baker (February 23, 1920 – July 2, 2001) was a British-American botanist and evolutionary ecologist who was an authority on pollination biology and breeding systems of angiosperms. He described what became known as "Baker's rule," a theoretical proposal underpinning an empirical observation that the ability to self-fertilize improves colonization ability among plants by increasing the probability of successful establishment after long-distance dispersal. He collaborated with his wife, Irene Baker, studying the content and function of nectar, and undertaking research and publishing papers on its evolutionary and taxonomic significance.

Early life and education 

Baker was born on February 23, 1920, in Brighton, England. He received his B.Sc. (1941) and Ph.D. (1945) from the University of London. He married a fellow biologist Irene Baker the same year.

Career 
He was appointed lecturer from 1945 to 1954 and senior lecturer from 1954 to 1957 at the University of Leeds, and Professor at University College of the Gold Coast, Ghana, respectively. In 1948, he spent one year as a visiting researcher at the Carnegie Institute of Washington, closely working with the all-star group of plant biologists, which included Jens Clausen, David Keck, and William Hiesey. Following that experience, the Bakers moved to the United States, where Herbert became Director of the Botanical Garden at the University of California, Berkeley. The appointment had been recently vacated by Thomas Goodspeed.

Baker remained at Berkeley for the rest of his career, as a director of the University of California Botanical Garden at Berkeley from 1957 to 1969 and professor of botany in 1960. Baker published over 175 research articles and supervised 49 Ph.D. students. He received numerous awards during his long and distinguished career. He was a member of both the American Academy of Arts and Sciences (1984) and the American Philosophical Society (1986).

Publications 

 The Genetics of Colonizing Species (1965). Edited with G. Ledyard Stebbins.
 Plants and Civilization (1965)

References 

1920 births
2001 deaths
20th-century British botanists
Alumni of the University of London
University of California, Berkeley College of Letters and Science faculty
People from Brighton
British emigrants to the United States
Evolutionary ecologists

Members of the American Philosophical Society